Arthur William Foote (March 5, 1853 in Salem, Massachusetts – April 8, 1937 in Boston, Massachusetts) was an American classical composer, and a member of the "Boston Six." The other five were George Whitefield Chadwick, Amy Beach, Edward MacDowell, John Knowles Paine, and Horatio Parker.

Biography
Foote was appointed organist of the First Church in Boston (Unitarian) in 1878, remaining there 32 years. A founder of the American Guild of Organists, he was one of the examiners at the first Guild Fellowship examination. He helped organize the New England chapter of the AGO, and from 1909 to 1912 (when the office was discontinued) he served as National Honorary President of the AGO, succeeding Horatio Parker in that position. He was one of the editors of Hymns of the Church Universal, a Unitarian hymnal published in 1890.

The modern tendency is to view Foote's music as "Romantic" and "European" in the light of the later generation of American composers such as Aaron Copland, Roy Harris and William Schuman, all of whom helped to develop a recognizably American sound in classical music. A Harvard graduate and the first noted American classical composer to be trained entirely in the U.S., in some sense he is to music what American poets were to literature before Walt Whitman.

Foote was an early advocate of Brahms and Wagner and promoted performances of their music. Foote was an active music teacher and wrote a number of pedagogical works, including Modern Harmony in Its Theory and Practice (1905), written with Walter R. Spalding. It was republished as Harmony (1969). He also wrote Some Practical Things in Piano-Playing (1909) and Modulation and Related Harmonic Questions (1919). He contributed many articles to music journals, including "Then and Now, Thirty Years of Musical Advance in America" in Etude (1913) and "A Bostonian Remembers" in Musical Quarterly (1937).

A good part of Foote's compositions consists of chamber music and these works are generally among his best. The Chamber Music Journal (2002), discussing Foote's chamber music, has written, "If his name is not entirely unknown, it is fair to say that his music is. This is a shame. Foote's chamber music is first rate, deserving of regular public performance." His Piano Quintet, Op.38 and Piano Quartet, Op.23, are singled out for special praise. With regard to the Piano Quintet, the author writes, "Each of the movements is a gem. The Scherzo is particularly fine and the rousing finale beyond reproach. I believe that the only reason this work never received the audience it deserved and deserves is because it was written by an American who was 'out of the loop.'" As for the Piano Quartet, the opinion is that "it is as good as any late 19th century piano quartet."

Foote lived in Dedham, Massachusetts and was a member of the Society in Dedham for Apprehending Horse Thieves. His students included Isabel Stewart North.

Selected works

 Three Pieces for Cello & Piano, Op. 1 (1881)
 String Quartet No. 1 in G minor, Op. 4
 Piano Trio No. 1 in C minor, Op. 5 (1883)
 Three Pieces for Violin & Piano, Op. 9
 Sonata for Violin & Piano, Op. 20
 Scherzo for Cello & Piano, Op. 22
 Piano Quartet in C major, Op. 23 (1890)
 Francesca da Rimini, Op. 24 (1890)
 Serenade for Strings in E major, Op. 25
 Three Pieces for Oboe (or Flute) & Piano, Op. 31 (Flute = Op. 31B)
 String Quartet No. 2 in E major, Op. 32 (Finale performed separately as Tema con Variazione) (1893)
 Cello Concerto in G minor, Op. 33
 Romanza for Cello & Piano, Op. 33 (piano reduction of slow movement of Cello Concerto, Op. 33)
 Piano Quintet in A minor, Op. 38 (1897)
 Melody for Violin & Piano, Op. 44
 Four Character Pieces after the Rubaiyat of Omar Khayyam, Op.48 (1900)
 Suite in E major for Strings, Op. 63 (premiered and first recorded by the Boston Symphony Orchestra) (1907)
 Piano Trio No. 2 in B flat major, Op. 65 (1907–1908)
 Ballad for Violin & Piano, Op. 69
 String Quartet No. 3 in D major, Op. 70
Seven Pieces for organ. Op. 71
 Two Pieces for Violin & Piano, Op. 74
 Legend for Violin & Piano, Op. 76
 Aubade for Cello & Piano, Op. 77

 Sonata for Viola & Piano, Op. 78A
 Nocturno & Scherzo for Flute & String Quartet, WoO. (1918, Nocturno also known as A Night Piece')
 At Dusk for Flute, Harp and Cello, WoO
 Sarabande & Rigaudon for Oboe (or Flute), Viola (or Violin) and Piano, WoO

References

Works cited

Further reading
The New Grove Dictionary of Music & Musicians, Ed. Sadie, Stanley, MacMillan 1980, 
The Chamber Music Journal, Vol XIII, No.2, 2002, p. 11,  (link does not lead to article content)
A Catalog of the Works of Arthur Foote, 1853–1937, Cipolla, Wilma Reid, Information Coordinators 1980, 

External links

, also includes List of Works
The Chamber Music of Arthur Foote. Sound-bites and information from several works.
Arthur Foote - biography page at the Unitarian Universalist Association web site
Art of the States: Arthur Foote Three Character Pieces, op. 9'' (1885)

1853 births
1937 deaths
19th-century classical composers
20th-century classical composers
American male classical composers
American Romantic composers
19th-century American composers
20th-century American composers
Classical musicians from Massachusetts
20th-century American male musicians
19th-century American male musicians
Pupils of John Knowles Paine
Harvard College alumni
People from Dedham, Massachusetts
People from Salem, Massachusetts
Society in Dedham for Apprehending Horse Thieves